Tianjin Hutchison Whampoa Metro Plaza is a skyscraper in Tianjin, China. The 53 story building was completed in 2013, construction having begun in 2008.

See also
Skyscraper design and construction
List of tallest buildings in China

References

Buildings and structures in Tianjin
Commercial buildings completed in 2013